Orlik Aerobatic Team (Zespół Akrobacyjny "ORLIK") is the aerobatic team of the Polish Air Force, formed in 1998 at the Polish Air Force Command College. Its first performance took place on April 15 1998, with its first foreign performance shortly later at the 1998 Royal International Air Tattoo at RAF Fairford. The team initially consisted of four pilots, with three formation pilots and one solo. Another solo pilot was added later on and at the end of 2000 the team increased to seven aircraft. Though it has also flown some seasons with nine aircraft, since 2011 the team flies seven aircraft.

The team receives its name from the aircraft it flies, the PZL-130 Orlik.

See also
 Scorpion aerobatic team
 Team Iskry

External links

 Official website

Military units and formations established in 1998
Aerobatic teams 
Military units and formations of the Polish Air Force